In Greek mythology, Callirrhoe, Callirhoe, Callirrhoë, or occasionally Kallirroi may refer to the following characters:
 Callirrhoe, one of the Oceanid daughters of Oceanus and Tethys, and the mother of Geryon by Chrysaor.
 Callirhoe, wife of Peiras, son of King Argus of Argos, son of Zeus and Niobe. She was the mother of Argus, Arestorides and Triopas.
 Callirhoe, daughter of the river god Scamander, wife of Tros, and thus, mother of Ilus, Assaracus, Ganymede, Cleopatra and possibly, Cleomestra. 
 Callirhoe, daughter of Meander and consort of Car.
 Callirhoe, naiad daughter of Nestus (Nessus), mother of Biston, Odomas and Edonus by Ares.
 Callirhoe, a maiden who was loved by Coresus.
 Callirrhoe, daughter of the river-god Achelous, who betrothed her to Alcmaeon.
 Callirhoe, daughter of Lycus, king of Libya. She fell in love with Diomedes and saved him from being sacrificed to Ares by her father. After Diomedes left Libya, she hanged herself.
 Callirhoe, daughter of the Boeotian Phocus.

Notes

References
 Apollodorus, The Library with an English Translation by Sir James George Frazer, F.B.A., F.R.S. in 2 Volumes, Cambridge, MA, Harvard University Press; London, William Heinemann Ltd. 1921. ISBN 0-674-99135-4. Online version at the Perseus Digital Library. Greek text available from the same website.
Gaius Julius Hyginus, Fabulae from The Myths of Hyginus translated and edited by Mary Grant. University of Kansas Publications in Humanistic Studies. Online version at the Topos Text Project.
 Hesiod, Theogony from The Homeric Hymns and Homerica with an English Translation by Hugh G. Evelyn-White, Cambridge, MA.,Harvard University Press; London, William Heinemann Ltd. 1914. Online version at the Perseus Digital Library. Greek text available from the same website.
 Lucius Mestrius Plutarchus, Moralia with an English Translation by Frank Cole Babbitt. Cambridge, MA. Harvard University Press. London. William Heinemann Ltd. 1936. Online version at the Perseus Digital Library. Greek text available from the same website.
Pausanias, Description of Greece with an English Translation by W.H.S. Jones, Litt.D., and H.A. Ormerod, M.A., in 4 Volumes. Cambridge, MA, Harvard University Press; London, William Heinemann Ltd. 1918. Online version at the Perseus Digital Library
 Pausanias, Graeciae Descriptio. 3 vols. Leipzig, Teubner. 1903.  Greek text available at the Perseus Digital Library.
 Stephanus of Byzantium, Stephani Byzantii Ethnicorum quae supersunt, edited by August Meineike (1790–1870), published 1849. A few entries from this important ancient handbook of place names have been translated by Brady Kiesling. Online version at the Topos Text Project.

Queens in Greek mythology
Children of Potamoi
Princesses in Greek mythology
Women of Ares